In linear algebra, the Rouché–Capelli theorem determines the number of solutions for a system of linear equations, given the rank of its augmented matrix and coefficient matrix. The theorem is variously known as the:
 Rouché–Capelli theorem in English speaking countries, Italy and Brazil;
 Kronecker–Capelli theorem in Austria, Poland, Romania, Serbia and Russia;
 Rouché–Fontené theorem in France;
 Rouché–Frobenius theorem in Spain and many countries in Latin America;
 Frobenius theorem in the Czech Republic and in Slovakia.

Formal statement 
A system of linear equations with n variables has a solution if and only if the rank of its coefficient matrix A is equal to the rank of its augmented matrix [A|b]. In particular:
 if n = rank(A), the solution is unique,
 otherwise there are infinitely many solutions.

Example
Consider the system of equations

 x + y + 2z = 3,
 x + y + z = 1,
 2x + 2y + 2z = 2.

The coefficient matrix is

and the augmented matrix is

Since both of these have the same rank, namely 2, there exists at least one solution; and since their rank is less than the number of unknowns, the latter being 3, there are infinitely many solutions.

In contrast, consider the system

 x + y + 2z = 3,
 x + y + z = 1,
 2x + 2y + 2z = 5.

The coefficient matrix is

and the augmented matrix is

In this example the coefficient matrix has rank 2, while the augmented matrix has rank 3; so this system of equations has no solution. Indeed, an increase in the number of linearly independent columns has made the system of equations inconsistent.

See also
Cramer's rule
Gaussian elimination

References

External links 
 Kronecker-Capelli Theorem at Wikibooks
Kronecker-Capelli's Theorem - youtube video with a proof
 Kronecker-Capelli theorem in the Encyclopaedia of Mathematics

Theorems in linear algebra
Matrix theory